Agdistis bellissima is a moth in the family Pterophoridae. It is known from Egypt, Saudi Arabia, Yemen, Jordan, Morocco and Tunisia.

References

Agdistinae
Moths of the Arabian Peninsula
Moths of the Middle East
Moths of Africa
Moths described in 1975